Said Suleiman Said (born 15 June 1958) is a Tanzanian CUF politician and Member of Parliament for Mtambwe constituency since 2010.

References

Living people
1958 births
Civic United Front MPs
Tanzanian MPs 2010–2015
Kiponda Secondary School alumni
Utaani Secondary School alumni
Fidel Castro Secondary School alumni
Zanzibari politicians